Sir Archibald Hector McIndoe  (4 May 1900 – 11 April 1960) was a New Zealand plastic surgeon who worked for the Royal Air Force during the Second World War. He improved the treatment and rehabilitation of badly burned aircrew.

Early life
Archibald McIndoe was born 4 May 1900 in Forbury, in Dunedin, New Zealand, into a family of four. His father was John McIndoe, a printer and his mother was the artist Mabel McIndoe née Hill. He had three brothers and one sister. McIndoe studied at Otago Boys' High School and later medicine at the University of Otago. After his graduation he became a house surgeon at Waikato Hospital.

In 1924 McIndoe was awarded the first New Zealand Fellowship at the Mayo Clinic in the United States to study pathological anatomy. The fellowship was for an unmarried doctor and as McIndoe had recently married Adonia Aitkin they had to keep their marriage secret and he sailed without her. When it was no longer possible to maintain the secret she joined him 12 months later. He worked in the clinic as First Assistant in Pathological Anatomy 1925–1927 and published several papers on chronic liver disease. Impressed with his skill, Lord Moynihan suggested a career in Britain, and in 1930 McIndoe moved to London.

When McIndoe could not find work, his cousin Sir Harold Gillies, an otolaryngologist specialising in plastic surgery (who now has an operation for reducing a broken cheekbone named after himself), invited him to join the private practice he ran with Rainsford Mowlem and offered him a job at St Bartholomew's Hospital, where he became a clinical assistant. In 1932 McIndoe received a permanent appointment as a General Surgeon and Lecturer at the Hospital for Tropical Diseases and the London School of Hygiene and Tropical Medicine.

In 1934, McIndoe received a Fellowship of the American College of Surgeons, where he worked until 1939. That year he became a consulting plastic surgeon to the Royal North Stafford Infirmary and to Croydon General Hospital. In 1938 he was appointed consultant in plastic surgery to the Royal Air Force.

Second World War

When the Second World War broke out plastic surgery was largely divided on service lines. Gillies went to Rooksdown House near Basingstoke, which became the principal army plastic surgery unit; Tommy Kilner (who had worked with Gillies during the First World War, and who now has a surgical instrument named after him, the kilner cheek retractor), went to Queen Mary's Hospital, Roehampton, and Mowlem to St Albans. McIndoe moved to the recently rebuilt Queen Victoria Hospital in East Grinstead, Sussex, and founded a Centre for Plastic and Jaw Surgery. There, he treated very deep burns and serious facial disfigurement like loss of eyelids. With McIndoe's support, patients at the hospital formed the Guinea Pig Club, a social club and mutual support network: members included Richard Hillary, Geoffrey Page, Bill Foxley and Jimmy Edwards.

McIndoe was a brilliant and quick surgeon. He not only developed new techniques for treating badly burned faces and hands but also recognised the importance of the rehabilitation of the casualties and particularly of social reintegration back into normal life. He disposed of the "convalescent uniforms" and let the patients use their service uniforms instead. With the help of two friends, Neville and Elaine Blond, he also encouraged the locals to support the patients and invite them to their homes. McIndoe referred to the patients as "his boys", while the staff called him "the Boss" or "the Maestro".

Important work included development of the walking-stalk skin graft, and the discovery that immersion in saline promoted healing as well as improving survival rates for victims with extensive burns – this was a serendipitous discovery drawn from observation of differential healing rates in pilots who had come down on land and in the sea.

Later years
After the end of the war McIndoe returned to private practice. His speciality was the "McIndoe nose".

McIndoe was created CBE in 1944 and after the war he received a number of British and foreign honours, including a Commandeur de la Légion d'honneur (Commander of the Legion of Honour) and was knighted in 1947 for his remarkable work on restoring the minds and bodies of the burnt young pilots of the Second World War through his innovative reconstructive surgery techniques. That same year he visited East Africa for the first time, and took up farming on Kilimanjaro. In 1957, with two former pupils, Michael Wood and Tom Rees, he co-founded the African Medical and Research Foundation (AMREF).

He became a member of a council of the Royal College of Surgeons in 1946 and its vice-president in 1958. His marriage to Adonia ended in 1953, and he married Constance Belchem in 1954. In 1958 McIndoe delivered the Bradshaw Lecture at the Royal College of Surgeons on the topic of the reconstruction of the burned face. He took part in the founding of the British Association of Plastic Surgeons (BAPS) and later served as its third President. The Guinea Pig Club continued to meet after the war, and McIndoe remained its President until his death.

Death
Archibald McIndoe died in his sleep of a heart attack on 11 April 1960, aged 59, in his house at 84 Albion Gate, London. He was cremated at Golders Green Crematorium, and his ashes were given the unique honour for a civilian of being buried at the Royal Air Force church of St Clement Danes in London.

Personal life
McIndoe married Adonia Aitkin of Dunedin on 31 July 1924. They had two daughters, Adonia and Vanora. They were divorced in 1953. In 1954 McIndoe married Constance Belchem, the former wife of Major-General R. F. K. Belchem.

Legacy

On 22 March 1961, the British Minister of Health opened the Blond McIndoe Centre named in his honour at the Queen Victoria Hospital, East Grinstead. The Blond McIndoe Centre, now named the Blond McIndoe Research Foundation, continues research into pioneering treatments to improve wound healing. The Blond McIndoe Research Foundation is a registered charity.

The McIndoe Burns Centre at Queen Victoria Hospital was dedicated in 1994, and there is a burns victim support group centred there which also bears his name.

Specialist science laboratories at Otago Boys' High School, built in 1967, are named in his honour. The school later named one of its houses after McIndoe after the introduction of a house system in 2013.

The Gillies McIndoe Research Institute, a major medical research centre in Wellington, New Zealand, is named in honour of McIndoe and his cousin Sir Harold Gillies.

In 2000 an English Heritage blue plaque was erected on McIndoe's former London home at Avenue Court, Draycott Avenue, Chelsea.

A bronze monument commemorating McIndoe by Martin Jennings, whose own father was one of his patients, was unveiled by Princess Anne in East Grinstead High Street, in front of Sackville College, in 2014. It depicts the standing McIndoe resting his hands reassuringly on the shoulders of a seated injured airman, whose burned hands are clawed together, and whose scarred face is turned to one side. The two figures are encircled by a stone bench.

Publications

See also
Mollie Lentaigne, a medical artist and nurse at East Grinstead who made drawings of McIndoe's procedures

References

Bibliography
 
 
  – autobiography of a double amputee (both legs) fighter pilot who was treated many times to repair facial damage

External links
Artists' Masks Hid Wounds of World War I Soldiers
Blond McIndoe Research Foundation
McIndoe Surgical Centre
75th Anniversary of The Guinea Pig Club & Sir Archibald McIndoe

 
1900 births
1960 deaths
Academics of the London School of Hygiene & Tropical Medicine
New Zealand Commanders of the Order of the British Empire
Commandeurs of the Légion d'honneur
Commanders of the Order of the White Lion
New Zealand Knights Bachelor
New Zealand expatriates in the United Kingdom
New Zealand recipients of the Légion d'honneur
People educated at Otago Boys' High School
New Zealand plastic surgeons
University of Otago alumni
Hill-McIndoe-Gillies family
20th-century surgeons
20th-century British medical doctors
20th-century New Zealand medical doctors
Members of the Guinea Pig Club